Bamboo Collage is Hitomi Takahashi's second album released under gr8! records, a division of Sony Records. The album was released on October 24, 2007, and, like its predecessor, the album came in two versions, CD Only and CD+DVD. There were a total of five singles to promote the album.

Overview
Bamboo Collage is the second original studio album to be released by Japanese punk/rock singer Hitomi Takahashi. The album came out just over a month after the release of her 8th single, "Tsuyoku Nare", and over a year and a half after her debut album "sympathy". The album contains a total of six new songs - the other seven were already released on the five singles released for the album's promotion. As with the singles released for this album, all songs were produced by Takuya, while music and lyrics were written by punk/rock artists such as shogo.k from 175R and Maeda and Yamamoto from GagagaSP.

Unlike her debut album, nearly every song on Bamboo Collage falls in the punk/rock genre, while only containing one true ballad song. The album even contains the genre of ska in the song "Breakthrough" - a genre that Takahashi had never before attempted. The version of "Ko·mo·re·bi" that appears on the album is modified so that it is no longer the ballad song it once was, but is now a punk/rock version to fit with the rest of the album.

Track listing

CD Portion
 "" – 5:16   Lyrics, music, and arrangement by Takuya 
 "" – 4:02   Lyrics by Hitomi Takahashi  Music and arrangement by Takuya 
 "Pride" – 3:35   Lyrics and music by shogo.k  Arrangement by Takuya 
 "" – 3:09   Lyrics by Kohei Japan  Music and arrangement by Takuya 
 "" – 5:36   Lyrics and music by Satoshi Yamamoto  Arrangement by Takuya 
 "" – 4:47   Lyrics by Takuya, Hitomi Takahashi, & mavie  Music and arrangement by Takuya 
 "" – 3:27   Lyrics and music by Cozakku Maeda  Arrangement by Takuya 
 "" – 3:10   Lyrics by Hitomi Takahashi & Hidenori Tanaka  Music by Kou Heiya  Arrangement by Takuya 
 "" – 5:13   Lyrics by Hitomi Takahashi & Akiko Watanabe  Music and arrangement by Takuya 
 " -Bamboo Ver.-" – 4:16   Lyrics by Hitomi Takahashi & Akiko Watanabe  Music and arrangement by Takuya 
 "Jet Boy Jet Girl" – 4:34   Lyrics by Hitomi Takahashi & mavie  Music and arrangement by Takuya 
 "Stay Tune" – 4:11   Lyrics by Kohei Japan  Music and arrangement by Takuya 
 "" – 3:02   Lyrics and music by Kuwahara Yasunobu  Arrangement by Takuya

DVD Portion
 "" (music video)
 "" (music video)
 "" (music video)
 "Jet Boy Jet Girl" (music video)
 "" (music video)

Personnel
 Hitomi Takahashi - vocals (All tracks)
 B-side Boys - backing vocals (Track #4)
 TAKUYA - guitars (All tracks), bass (Track #2), programming (Tracks #2, #3, & #11), & keyboards (Track #3 & #11)
 Hirose "HEESEY" Yōichi - bass (Tracks #1, #4, #5, #7, #8, #10, & #12)
 Sōru Tōru - drums (Tracks #1, #4, #5, #7, #8, #10, & #12)
 nishi-ken - keyboards (Tracks #1, #4, #7, #8, #10, #11, & #12)
 Kōta Igarashi - drums (Tracks #2, #3, #6, #11, & #13)
 Katsuhiko Kurosu - bass (Tracks #3, #6, & #11)
 Ken Iikawa (LONG SHOT PARTY) - trumpet (Track #4)
 kj (LONG SHOT PARTY) - sax (Track #4)
 Koji Igarashi - keyboards (Tracks #5, #6, & #9)
 Steve Etou - percussions (Track #6)
 Ninji - bass (Track #9)
 Takashi Furuta - drums (Track #9)
 Kuwahara Yasunobu- bass (Track #13)

Production
 Directors - Kazuma Jo & Taku Sugawara
 Art Direction - Junya Mathyama
 Jacket Design - Saori "hammer" Hamanaka
 Styling - Mika Nagasawa
 Hair & Make-up - Naoki Katagiri

Charts
Album - Oricon Sales Chart (Japan)

Singles - Oricon Sales Chart (Japan)

References 

2007 albums
Hitomi Takahashi (singer) albums
Gr8! Records singles